Mangaldan Airfield is a World War II airfield located north of the town of Mangaldan, near Lingayen Gulf, to the east of Dagupan in the province of Pangasinan on the island of Luzon in the Philippines.  It was abandoned after the war.

History
The airfield was built after the American liberation in early January 1945 and was used as a medium bomber and fighter airfield during the 1945 Battle of the Philippines.

Mangaldan airfield was abandoned after the war and fell into a state of disuse.  The town of Mangaldan has absorbed traces of the airbase, the runway area has reverted to rice paddy planting area and irrigated pools for fish farms and open space. In past decades farmers reported finding bullets and other remains, but not many traces of the airbase remain today.

Units assigned
 35th Fighter Group		(20 January – 10 April 1945)
 58th Fighter Group		(5–18 April 1945)
 312th Bombardment Group      (10 February – 19 April 1945)

See also

 USAAF in the Southwest Pacific
 Louis Edward Curdes

References

 Maurer, Maurer (1983). Air Force Combat Units Of World War II. Maxwell AFB, Alabama: Office of Air Force History. .
 www.pacificwrecks.com

External links

Airfields of the United States Army Air Forces in the Philippines
Military history of the Philippines during World War II
Buildings and structures in Pangasinan
History of Pangasinan
Airports established in 1945